Sunxiuqinia faeciviva is a facultatively anaerobic and organoheterotrophic bacterium from the genus of Sunxiuqinia which has been isolated from deep subseafloor sediments from the Shimokita Peninsula.

References

Bacteroidia
Bacteria described in 2013